The 2017 World Weightlifting Championships were held in Anaheim, California, United States from 28 November to 5 December 2017.

Doping bans
Nine countries were banned from competing at the World Championships due to their history of doping at previous Olympic Games, under International Weightlifting Federation rules stating that any country that had three positive tests uncovered by the International Olympic Committee during re-testing of stored urine samples for banned substances from the 2008 and 2012 Olympics would be banned.

The banned countries were: Russia, China, Kazakhstan, Armenia, Turkey, Moldova, Ukraine, Belarus and Azerbaijan.

Boycott
North Korea and Venezuela boycotted the World Championships due to the crises in relations between the United States and these countries. The World Championships organizing committee had said it did not foresee any visa problems for the North Korean team.

Medal summary

Men

Women

Medal table
Ranking by Big (Total result) medals
 

Ranking by all medals: Big (Total result) and Small (Snatch and Clean & Jerk)

Team ranking

Men

Women

Participating nations
A total of 315 competitors from 63 nations participated.

 (5)
 (1)
 (1)
 (1)
 (6)
 (5)
 (4)
 (9)
 (2)
 (11)
 (16)
 (1)
 (1)
 (4)
 (3)
 (1)
 (11)
 (5)
 (2)
 (2)
 (5)
 (7)
 (4)
 (8)
 (3)
 (5)
 (2)
 (4)
 (8)
 (8)
 (1)
 (1)
 (5)
 (8)
 (15)
 (2)
 (1)
 (4)
 (1)
 (1)
 (11)
 (3)
 (2)
 (2)
 (5)
 (2)
 (5)
 (1)
 (6)
 (6)
 (1)
 (1)
 (1)
 (11)
 (10)
 (2)
 (16)
 (1)
 (5)
 (2)
 (16)
 (10)
 (12)

References

External links
Official website
Results
Results Book

 
2017
World Weightlifting Championships
World Weightlifting Championships
World Weightlifting Championships
World Weightlifting Championships
Sports competitions in Anaheim, California
World Weightlifting Championships
World Weightlifting Championships